Zaman Kahriz (also Romanized as Zamān Kahrīz; also known as Zabān Kahrīz) is a village in Padena-ye Olya Rural District, Padena District, Semirom County, Isfahan Province, Iran. At the 2006 census, its population was 60, in 16 families.

References 

Populated places in Semirom County